Heward is a surname. Notable people with the surname include:

 Anthony Heward (1918–1995), RAF commander
 Brian Heward (1935–2012), English footballer
 Dag Heward-Mills (born 1963), English-born evangelist etc. in Ghana
 Ian Heward (born 1964), British racing driver
 Jamie Heward (born 1971), Canadian ice hockey player
 Lacey Heward, American para-alpine skier in 2002 Winter Paralympics
 Leslie Heward (1897–1943), English conductor and composer
 Noah Heward (born 2000), English rugby union player
 Percy W. Heward (1882–1946), English evangelist
 Prudence Heward (1896–1947), Canadian painter
 Stephen Heward (1777?–1828), public official in Upper Canada
 Tom Heward-Belle (born 1997), Australian footballer

Other uses
 Heward (Greyhawk), a deity in the Greyhawk fictional universe
 Heward, Saskatchewan, a village
 Heward Grafftey (1928–2010), Canadian politician

See also 
 Hayward (disambiguation)
 Heyward
 Howard (surname)